Mandaya is an Austronesian language of Mindanao in the Philippines. It may be intelligible with Mansaka.

Geographical distribution
Ethnologue reports that Mandaya is spoken in Manay, Caraga, Baganga, and Cateel municipalities of Davao Oriental Province, as well as in Davao del Norte Province.

Varieties
Ethnologue lists the following varieties of Mandaya.

Carraga Mandaya
Cateeleño
Manay Mandayan
Mandaya
Cataelano
Karaga
Sangab
Mangaragan Mandaya

Pallesen (1985) lists the following varieties of Mandaya.
Kabasagan
Caragan
Boso: spoken just inland from Mati, Davao Oriental
Maragusan
Mandaya Islam (or Kalagan Piso): spoken on the east coast of Davao Gulf directly east of Davao City, in Davao del Norte.

References

Mansakan languages
Languages of Davao Oriental
Languages of Davao de Oro